Peter Orry Larsen (born 25 February 1989 in Aveiro, Portugal) is a Norwegian footballer currently playing for Aalesund.

Career

SK Brann
On 18 February 2017, Larsen signed for Brann

Back to Aalesund
Larsen rejoined Aalesund for the 2019 season, when he signed a two-year contract with the club on 3 December 2018.

Career statistics

Club

References

External links
 Profile at AaFK.no
 
 

1989 births
Living people
People from Aveiro, Portugal
People from Vågsøy
Norway youth international footballers
Norway under-21 international footballers
Norwegian footballers
Eliteserien players
Norwegian First Division players
Aalesunds FK players
SK Brann players
Association football midfielders
Sportspeople from Vestland